The Coat of arms of the Second Spanish Republic was the emblem of the Second Spanish Republic, the government that existed in Spain between April 14, 1931, when King Alfonso XIII left the country, and April 1, 1939, when the last of the Republican forces surrendered to Francoist forces at the end of the Spanish Civil War.

The national flag of the Second Spanish Republic would have the coat of arms in the middle of the central yellow band. There was no coat of arms in the Spanish Republican Civil Ensign.

History

Origin
Following the 1868 Revolution that put an end to the unpopular reign of Isabella II the Provisional Government that was subsequently established decided to modify the Spanish symbols, doing away with the monarchic elements of the Bourbon Dynasty that had been up till then part of them. After reviewing a few proposals, one of which included a green civic crown, the following coat of arms was adopted: quarterly of Castile, Leon, Aragon and Navarre enté en point of Granada. The crown was a mural crown instead of the royal crown.

The First Spanish Republic that was instituted in 1873 adopted the coat of arms of the 1868–1871 Provisional Government without changes.
The mural crown topped coat of arms was one of the main official symbols of Spain until the 1874 coup d'état by General Arsenio Martínez-Campos initiated the Bourbon Restoration, putting an end to the period known as Democratic Sexennium (Sexenio Democrático).

1931
The Spanish Republic reestablished in 1931 revived the coat of arms of the short-lived First Spanish Republic (1873–1874) which had originated in turn in the revision of Spanish symbols that followed the Revolution of 1868. The only exception was that the lion of the second quarter was depicted uncrowned.

The coat of arms of the Second Spanish Republic was flanked by the two Pillars of Hercules bearing scrolls with the motto Plus Ultra (Latin for further beyond). The colour of the scrolls is usually white or pale golden, but there is a high proportion of official representations displaying the red colour.

Gallery

See also
Coat of arms of Spain
List of coats of arms of Spain
Flag of the Second Spanish Republic
Spanish heraldry

References

External links 

Wikisource - Decreto del Gobierno Provisional de la República de 27 de abril de 1931 
 Informe dirigido al Gobierno de la República sobre el escudo de armas, leyenda y atributos de la moneda (1873). Biblioteca Virtual Miguel de Cervantes 
 Coat of Arms of the Second Spanish republic - FOTW 

Second Spanish Republic
National symbols of Spain
Second Spanish Republic
Republicanism in Spain
Spanish Republic, Second
Spanish Republic, Second
Spanish Republic, Second